The grey-crowned warbler (Phylloscopus tephrocephalus) is a species of Old World warbler in the family Phylloscopidae. It is found in Bangladesh, China, India, Laos, Myanmar, Thailand and Vietnam. Its natural habitats are temperate forests, subtropical or tropical moist lowland forest, and subtropical or tropical moist montane forest.

The grey-crowned warbler was previously placed in the genus Seicercus. However, a molecular phylogenetic study published in 2018 found that neither Phylloscopus nor Seicercus were monophyletic. In the subsequent reorganization, the two genera were merged into Phylloscopus, which has priority under the rules of the International Commission on Zoological Nomenclature.

References

Phylloscopus
Birds of China
Birds of Northeast India
Birds of Myanmar
Birds of Yunnan
grey-crowned warbler
Taxonomy articles created by Polbot